Adenstedt is a village and a former municipality in the district of Hildesheim in Lower Saxony, Germany. Since 1 November 2016 it has been part of the municipality of Sibbesse.

Sports

Football 
SG Adenstedt (1894/1914)

References 

Hildesheim (district)
Former municipalities in Lower Saxony